George Russell (1857–1951) was born in Stillington and lived in York, England. He is most notable for his work developing the Russell Hybrid Lupins. A gardener by occupation, he began experimenting with Lupins in his fifties, after being inspired by the sight of a vase of the flowers at the home of one of his employers.

Over more than twenty years, he used natural pollination by bumble-bees to develop hybrids with flower spikes that were larger and more colourful than the original Lupinus polyphyllus. He was 79 when he first exhibited at Chelsea,  and  the Royal Horticultural Society awarded him the Veitch Memorial Medal in 1937 for his achievements.

In 2013, when the RHS held a vote to determine their 'plant of the centenary', Russell Hybrid Lupins were selected as the top plant to have debuted during the period 1933-1942 and voted second overall.

Some of the Lupins created by Russell were named after his friends and neighbours. These include the 'Mrs Micklethwaite', for the employer who originally inspired his work, and the 'Mrs Noel Terry' named after Kathleen Terry of the Terry's chocolate-manufacturing family. At one time there were 152 named varieties but in the years after Russell's death many of these were either lost to Cucumber mosaic virus or allowed to self-sow enabling them to revert to their original colours.

Selective List of Russell Hybrid Lupins (with colours if known)

Bluejacket : blue and white
 Catherine of York
 Gallery White 
 Gallery Yellow
 Helen of York
 Joan of York
 Masterpiece 
 Manhattan Lights
 Mrs Micklethwaite
 Mrs Noel Terry : pink
 My Castle
 Nellie B. Allen : salmon pink 
 Noble Maiden 
 Purple Swirl 
 The Chatelaine 
 The Governor
 Thundercloud : purple and mauve

References

1857 births
1951 deaths
People from Hambleton District
English horticulturists
Lupinus
Veitch Memorial Medal recipients